Year 1426 (MCDXXVI) was a common year starting on Tuesday (link will display the full calendar) of the Julian calendar.

Events 
 March 6 – Battle of St. James (near Avranches):  An English army under John, Duke of Bedford, defeats the French under Arthur de Richemont, forcing the Duke of Brittany to recognize English suzerainty.
 c. May 15 - 16 – Kale Kye-Taung Nyo, ruler of the Kingdom of Ava, flees his capital. He is succeeded by Mohnyin Thado, who receives Thinkhaya III of Toungoo.
 June 16 – Hussite Wars – Battle of Usti nad Labem: The Hussites decisively beat the crusading armies in the Fourth Anti-Hussite Crusade.
 July 7 – Battle of Chirokitia: King Janus of Cyprus is defeated and captured by the Mamluks and brought to Egypt, where he is ransomed after ten months.
 Date unknown
 Castello Orsini-Odescalchi is built in Bracciano, Italy by the Orsini family.
 Eunuch-dominated secret police start to control the palace guards and imperial workshops, infiltrate the civil service, and head all foreign missions in China.

Births 
 February 2 – Eleanor of Navarre, queen regnant of Navarre (d. 1479)
 February – Christian of Oldenburg, King of Denmark 1448–1481, of Norway 1450–1481 and of Sweden 1457–1464 (d. 1481)
 July 13 – Anne Neville, Countess of Warwick (d. 1492)
 September 19 – Maria of Cleves, French noble (d. 1487)
 November 30 – Johann IV Roth, Roman Catholic bishop (d. 1506)
 date unknown – John II, Duke of Bourbon (d. 1488)

Deaths 
 March / May – Thomas Hoccleve, English poet (b. c. 1368)
 c. late May – Kale Kye-Taung Nyo, deposed King of Ava (b. c. 1385)
 September 18 – Hubert van Eyck, painter
 November 24 – Elizabeth of Lancaster, Duchess of Exeter, English Plantagent noblewoman, daughter of John of Gaunt (b. c. 1363)
 December – Pippo Spano, Hungarian military leader (b. 1369)
 December 31 – Thomas Beaufort, Duke of Exeter, English nobleman and military leader (b. c. 1377)
 date unknown – Tezozomoc, Tepanec ruler of Azcapotzalco and military leader

References